Utopia is the first full-length album by Canadian avant-garde extreme metal band Unexpect. It was released in 1999 by the band itself and is recorded and mixed by the band with help of Serge Cosette.

Track listing
"Vespers Gold" – 7:32
"Constellations and Mysticism" – 5:37
"Metamorphosis" – 2:45
"Shades of a Forbidden Passion" – 6:44
"Palace of Dancing Souls" – 2:54
"The Fall of Arthrone" – 7:28
"Ethereal Dimensions" – 7:46
"The Flames of Knowledge Forever Lost" – 7:16
"In Velvet Coffins We Sleep" – 8:53
"The Revival" – 8:34

Personnel
 – vocals, guitar
Zircon – bass guitar
Lunorin (Exod) – drums
Merzenya - keyboard
Le bateleur – violin
Artagoth - vocals, guitar
Elda – vocals

Unexpect albums
1999 albums